Cheremushki is a rural locality (a selo) in Mukhinsky Selsoviet of Oktyabrsky District, Amur Oblast, Russia. The population was 114 as of 2018. There are 7 streets.

Geography 
Cheremushki is located 37 km southwest of Yekaterinoslavka (the district's administrative centre) by road. Mukhinsky is the nearest rural locality.

References 

Rural localities in Oktyabrsky District, Amur Oblast